Somonino  is a village in Kartuzy County, Pomeranian Voivodeship, in northern Poland. It is the seat of the gmina (administrative district) called Gmina Somonino. It is located in the ethnocultural region of Kashubia in the historic region of Pomerania.

The village has a population of 2,206.

History

During the German occupation of Poland (World War II), Somonino was one of the sites of executions of Poles, carried out by the Germans in 1939 as part of the Intelligenzaktion. Poles from Somonino were also among the victims of massacres of Poles, committed by the Germans in nearby Kaliska in October and November 1939, also as part of the Intelligenzaktion.

References

Villages in Kartuzy County